The men's flyweight event was part of the boxing programme at the 1924 Summer Olympics.  The weight class was the lightest contested, and allowed boxers of up to 112 pounds (50.8 kilograms). The competition was held from July 15, 1924, to July 20, 1924. 19 boxers from 13 nations competed.

Results

References

Sources
 official report
 

Flyweight